Ptyssoptera phaeochrysa is a moth of the family Palaephatidae. It is found in the Australian states of New South Wales and Queensland.

References

Moths described in 1926
Palaephatidae